Paper Mâché Tiger (often abbreviated as P.M.Tiger) is an American alternative rock band based in Clearwater, Florida. The band is composed of Jordan Rosenberg, Joshua Rosenberg, Max McEwan, John Bruno, and Adam Kennedy. The band began releasing music in 2018 with their first single "Sometimes." In 2022, they released their debut album My Love Music.

History 
Paper Mâché Tiger was formed in 2018 by Jordan Rosenberg (Lead Vocals/Guitar), Joshua Rosenberg (Keys/Vocals), Max McEwan (Bass/Vocals) and John Bruno (Lead Guitar/Vocals). Their debut single, "Sometimes," was released in June, 2018. This was followed by the singles "Ithinkthankyou" that same month, and "Mother Moon" in July, 2018.

In July, 2020, their debut EP, Questionable Things was released, with all proceeds from the EP donated to bail out local protestors. They later began touring as an opener for the Plain White T's. Tom Higgenson described their music as "pretty damn good." Around this time, drummer Adam Kennedy joined the band.

In October, 2021, Paper Mâché Tiger released the single "Indica." This song is a part of their debut album, My Love Music, released in February, 2022. My Love Music was produced by platinum record producer Gordon Raphael. At the same time, their single "8-Ball" was released, along with a music video. Following the release of My Love Music, the band set out on the My Love Music tour. In March, 2022, they were included in Convicted Printing's list of "5 Artists you must hear to kick off the spring right!". In November, 2022, they released new single "Catfish Motel".

Members 

 Jordan Rosenberg – lead vocals, guitar 
 Joshua Rosenberg – vocals, keyboards 
 Max McEwan – vocals, bass guitar 
 John Bruno – vocals, lead guitar 
 Adam Kennedy – drums 
 Josh Naaman – drums

Discography

Albums 

 My Love Music (2022)

EPs 

 Questionable Things (2020)

References

External links 

 https://pmtiger.band/

Alternative rock groups from Florida
Musical quartets
Musical groups established in 2018